Pancham Baidik is a Bengali theatre group directed by Shaoli Mitra. Nathabati Anaathabat, the group's first production was staged in 1983.

Productions 
 Nathabati Anaathabat
 Katha Amritasaman
 Rajnaitik Hatya
 Poshu Khamar
 A–Parajita
 Ghare Baire
 Ebong Debjani
 Astomito Madhyanha
 Duto Din
 Karubasana

References

External links 
 

Theatre companies in India
Organisations based in Kolkata
Bengali theatre groups
1983 establishments in West Bengal
Arts organizations established in 1983